William Halstead (June 4, 1794 – March 4, 1878) was an American Whig Party politician who represented New Jersey at large in the United States House of Representatives from 1837 to 1839, and again from 1841 to 1843.

Halstead was born in Elizabeth, New Jersey on June 4, 1794. He graduated from Princeton College in 1812, studied law, was admitted to the bar in 1816, and commenced practice in Trenton, New Jersey. He was appointed reporter of the New Jersey Supreme Court on November 23, 1821, and served until 1832. He published seven volumes of Halstead's Law Reports. He was prosecuting attorney of Hunterdon County from 1824 to 1829 and 1833 to 1837.

Halstead was elected as a Whig to the Twenty-fifth Congress, serving from March 4, 1837 – March 3, 1839. He presented credentials as a Member-elect to the Twenty-sixth Congress but the House declined to seat him. He was elected to the Twenty-seventh Congress, serving from March 4, 1841 – March 3, 1843. He served as chairman of the United States House Committee on Elections in the Twenty-seventh Congress.

After leaving Congress, he was appointed by President Zachary Taylor as U.S. Attorney for the District of New Jersey and served from 1849 to 1853. He raised the 1st New Jersey Volunteer Cavalry during the American Civil War and served as its colonel until February 18, 1862. He retired from public life and died in Trenton on March 4, 1878, and was interred there in Riverview Cemetery.

References

External links

1794 births
1878 deaths
Politicians from Elizabeth, New Jersey
American people of English descent
Whig Party members of the United States House of Representatives from New Jersey
United States Attorneys for the District of New Jersey
New Jersey lawyers
Princeton University alumni
People of New Jersey in the American Civil War
Union Army colonels
19th-century American lawyers